Upstairs cafés are cafés in Hong Kong that are located above street level. They became popular in the early 2000s. They are mainly located in the upper floors of old commercial and mixed residential/commercial buildings in districts such as Mong Kok, Tsim Sha Tsui and Causeway Bay. They have been recognised as a specific kind of catering outlet in Hong Kong. There is a special classification of "upstairs cafés" in Hong Kong’s dining guide websites such as OpenRice. Most of them have themed decorations such as pets, teddy bears, manga, or classrooms. Apart from food and drinks, many upstairs cafés in Hong Kong also provide free entertainment for customers such as Jenga, card games, chess sets and board games. Customers of upstairs cafés sometimes reserve the whole outlet for parties and gatherings because the price of reservation is not as expensive as that of restaurants at street level.
Upstairs cafés are typically small businesses. These cafés are usually tiny, unadvertised, and located in unmarked buildings in Hong Kong. They are far from the dining outlets on the streets which have high visibility. Therefore, it is difficult for people to know the existence of these upstairs cafés. People in Hong Kong usually learn about upstairs cafés from their friends, magazine articles, catering guide websites, or online blogs and forums.

Reasons for existence 
Firstly, as Hong Kong is facing a land shortage, retail rents in Hong Kong keep rising. According to property consultant CB Richard Ellis (CBRE), Hong Kong placed second with an average rent of US$1,695 per square foot per year in the report on global retail rents in the third quarter of 2011. Entrepreneurs of upstairs cafés choose the upstairs locations to avoid the high rents charged for ground-floor spaces.

Also, Hong Kong is a small and densely populated city. There are limited public spaces for people to gather with their friends. Even in these, it can be very difficult to find a nice place sit down and enjoy a cup of coffee without paying too much. This is why upstairs cafes are popular in Hong Kong. They provide a cozy environment for people to relax, often where people are able to chat with their friends without any time limit.

Lastly, upstairs cafés often have unique marketing strategies to fight against chain competitors, such as Starbucks and Pacific Coffee Company, in Hong Kong. Many upstairs cafes have their own themes to make themselves stand out from the others and remain competitive so that their business can survive.

Relation to Hong Kong youth culture 

Upstairs cafés are one of the common leisure spots for youngsters in Hong Kong. Their popularity comes from the uniqueness of different cafés. They usually have specific thematic concepts, some of them providing board games for customers, and some others lending books to customers. The wide variety of upstairs cafés has attracted many teenagers to pay a visit.

According to Erikson's stages of psychosocial development, youngsters in this stage are in search of identity and looking to stand out from others. One way would be visiting these uncommon places.
 
Moreover, these upstairs cafés also provide business opportunities for young entrepreneurs. Upstairs cafes can be a platform for youngsters to showcase their creativity and talents as they compete by using different strategies to draw attention from customers.
 
"Lazy" is one of the traits that media loves to use when describing Hong Kong’s "post 90s", which is youngsters born after the year of 1990. One of the claimed reasons is that they enjoy doing nothing. The popping up of more cafés in Hong Kong is partially related to this phenomenon, as youngsters in Hong Kong would rather spend hours in these upstairs cafés chatting with friends, rather than go for a hike on a sunny day.
Besides, youngsters in Hong Kong are often living in packed houses, due to the overloaded population and lack of housing in Hong Kong. So these upstairs cafés also provide a common area for friend gatherings since crowded houses in Hong Kong may not be suitable for group of friends to play together.

Unlicensed upstairs cafés 
There are a lot of upstairs cafes that are unlicensed. According to the " Food Business Regulation", unlicensed operation of a restaurant is subjected to a maximum fine of $50,000 and imprisonment for six months. However, since most of the upstairs café are located in the upstairs, which might locate in some hidden places, it is difficult for the government to find out.

The Food and Environmental Hygiene Department only has 200 inspectors who are responsible for inspecting the restaurants. Without receiving any complaints, it is difficult to uncover unlicensed cafés located in different buildings and different district. Without licenses, a lot of safety problems may arise.
For instance, food hygiene problems, lacking of fire escape exits, problems of building structure etc. In addition, the quality of food and the hygiene of the environment may not be guaranteed. One of the examples is that some of the unlicensed cafés will allow people to smoke inside the café, which pollute the air quality and violate the law. These cafés may have their own "spy" to check whether there are any inspectors. Therefore, once when one was reported to the Tobacco Control Office, the inspectors could not find anyone who violated the law. These problems often arise in the unlicensed upstairs café in Hong Kong, which affect people’s health and safety.

References

Restaurants in Hong Kong